Mads Bidstrup (born 25 February 2001) is a Danish professional footballer who plays as a midfielder for Danish Superliga club Nordsjælland, on loan from  club Brentford. He is a product of the Copenhagen academy has been capped by Denmark at youth level.

Club career

Early career
A midfielder, Bidstrup began his career in the youth systems at Herfølge, Brøndby and Copenhagen. In January 2018, he transferred to German club RB Leipzig for an initial 15 million kr fee. Bidstrup was a part of the RB Leipzig U19 team which reached the 2019 DFB-Pokal Junior Final and despite having three years remaining on his contract, he departed the club in July 2020.

Brentford
On 16 July 2020, Bidstrup joined the B team at English Championship club Brentford on a three-year contract, with the option of a further year, for an undisclosed fee. He was included in the first team group for its pre-season training camp at St George's Park, but suffered a patella injury during the camp, which required surgery. After returning to fitness, Bidstrup made his B team debut in a match versus a Stevenage XI on 14 February 2021 and three days later, he won his maiden call into the first team squad for a league match versus West London rivals Queens Park Rangers. He remained an unused substitute during the 2–1 defeat and was thereafter a regular inclusion on the bench. Bidstrup made six late-season appearances, including a substitute cameo in the promotion-clinching 2–0 2021 Championship play-off Final victory over Swansea City on 29 May. He was promoted into the first team squad in June 2021.

Bidstrup was a frequent inclusion on the substitutes' bench for Premier League matches during the first half of the 2021–22 season. He predominantly featured in cup competitions and his starting performance in a 4–1 FA Cup third round win over Port Vale on 8 January 2022 was recognised with a nomination for a place in the Team of the Round. Three weeks later and in need of "a run of consecutive matches in order to progress to the next level", Bidstrup joined Danish Superliga club Nordsjælland on loan until the end of the 2021–22 season. He made 13 appearances before returning to Brentford and signing a new two-year contract (with a two-year option) during the 2022 off-season. On 5 July 2022, Bidstrup rejoined Nordsjælland on loan for the duration of the 2022–23 season.

International career
Bidstrup won 22 caps and scored one goal for Denmark between U16 and U19 level. He was called into the U20 squad for two friendlies in June 2021, but later withdrew. Bidstrup won his maiden U21 call-up for a pair of matches in September 2021 and he appeared in both.

Style of play 
Brentford manager Thomas Frank stated that Bidstrup "can play as a number six or a number eight. His pressing ability is excellent in terms of the area that he is able to cover on the pitch and he also has the pace on the half turn with the ball to move it forward".

Personal life
Bidstrup attended Niels Brock Copenhagen Business College.

Career statistics

Honours
Brentford
EFL Championship play-offs: 2021

References

External links

Mads Bidstrup at brentfordfc.com
Mads Bidstrup at fcn.dk

2001 births
Living people
Danish men's footballers
Danish expatriate men's footballers
People from Køge Municipality
Denmark youth international footballers
Association football midfielders
Denmark under-21 international footballers
Sportspeople from Region Zealand
Brentford F.C. players
FC Nordsjælland players
English Football League players
Premier League players
Danish Superliga players
Expatriate footballers in England
Expatriate footballers in Germany
Danish expatriate sportspeople in England
Danish expatriate sportspeople in Germany